Mõisaküla was a village in Salme Parish, Saare County, Estonia, on the island of Saaremaa. As of 2011 Census, the settlement's population was 5.

During the administrative reform in 2017, the village was unified with Kaugatoma village.

References 

Villages in Saare County